is a private university in Niigata, Niigata, Japan. It was established in 1977.

External links
 Official website 

Educational institutions established in 1977
Private universities and colleges in Japan
Universities and colleges in Niigata Prefecture
1977 establishments in Japan